Kokki is a 2006 Indian Tamil-language action film written and directed by Prabhu Solomon and produced by Sethu and Dheeraj Kher. The film stars Karan, Pooja Gandhi, and Kota Srinivasa Rao. The music was composed by Dhina with editing by Suresh Urs and cinematography by M. Jeevan. The film released on 12 May 2006 and had a successful run at the box office.

Plot
Kokkisaamy (Karan) is a rugged but kindhearted orphan who works as a barber at his guardian's saloon in Chennai. He got released from prison a month before after completing his seven-year punishment, when he kills a man who tries to harass a girl. When Kokki is all set to go Malaysia for his job, he is sent to Uppiliappan's (Kota Srinivasa Rao) house in order to give him a haircut. That day, Uppili wakes up at Kokki's face accidentally instead of his favorite god. As a coincidence that day brings more fortune to Uppili's life, his astrologer thinks that it is the power of waking up at Kokki's face. The next day, Uppili's men wanted Kokki for a seven-year contract as they think the fortune would continue if Kokki is being with them. But Kokki rejected the offer and tries to leave city. A frustrated Uppili sends his goons to find Kokki, and they take his passports and other certificates. Kokki made a complaint against Uppili in police station. But the corrupted police inspector tries to frame Kokki for a crime that he did not commit. Kokki escapes somehow from the station and hides inside a ladies hostel at night.

At the hostel, a girl named Raaji (Pooja Gandhi) tries to commit suicide by hanging herself, when she was at her college drama rehearsal. The scenario backfires on her as she truly ending up dying by hanging. Kokki saves her with his effort, and she gives food and shelter to him after hearing his story. Kokki leaves from the hostel and runs all over the city when the cops chase him. In the chasing, a policeman dies in a road accident. However, the police inspector who tried to frame Kokki before, charges a file that Kokki killed the policeman too. Kokki tries to leave the city with the help of Raaji, but Uppili's gang kidnaps her as a bait for Kokki. When Kokki comes to rescue Raaji, he kills Uppili in order to save her. The movie ends with Raaji recovering at a hospital and Kokki being arrested by the inspector for killing Uppili.

Cast
 Karan as Kokkisaamy
 Sanjana as Raaji 
 Seema
 Kota Srinivasa Rao as Uppiliappan 
 Shakthhi Kumar as Police Officer
 Malaysia Vasudevan as Subburaju 
 Manikka Vinayagam
 Vidharth as Anbu, right hand for Uppaliappan (uncredited)

Soundtrack
Soundtrack was composed by Dhina.

Critical reception
S. Sudha of Rediff.com  rated the film two out of five stars and writes that "Kokki is a slick entertainer. Go, watch". A critic from Sify opined that "With all its pros and cons, Kokki is a welcome relief from the usual masala rowdy movies and the best part is that it is only two hours and quite racy".

Box office

The film was a box office success.

References

2006 films
2000s Tamil-language films
Indian action thriller films
Films directed by Prabhu Solomon
2006 action thriller films